Takako Katō (born April 12, 1971) is a Japanese female former professional basketball player. She won a silver medal with the Japan women's national basketball team at the 1994 Asian Games. Katō also competed at the 1996 Summer Olympics, where Japan's team came in seventh place.

References 

1971 births
Living people
Japanese women's basketball players
Basketball players at the 1996 Summer Olympics
Olympic basketball players of Japan
Basketball players at the 1994 Asian Games
Asian Games medalists in basketball
Asian Games silver medalists for Japan
Sportspeople from Yokohama
Medalists at the 1994 Asian Games